Sanki Daroga ( Crazy Inspector) is a 2018 Indian Bhojpuri-language action film starring Ravi Kishan and Anjana Singh and directed by Saif Kidwai. The film was written by Kishan and produced by Ravi Kishan Productions, marking Kishan's debut as a producer. Manoj Tiger, Pappu Yadav, Priti Shukla, Pinkul, Sagar Salman, and Jeet Rastogi appear in supporting roles.

The film was released on 7 September 2018 in theatres in the Indian states of Bihar and Jharkhand. On 14 September 2018, it was released in theatres in Mumbai and Gujarat. Sanki Daroga also had its first international release outside India in Bangkok, Thailand, where it premiered on 12 October 2018 to packed theaters. Ravi Kishan attended the premiere in Bangkok and also attended the Durga Pujas at Dev Mandir, Vishnu Mandir, and Geetha Ashram along with Bhojpuri singer Kalpana Patowary.

The film is based on true events and addresses issues of rape and crimes committed against women in India. It emphasizes the importance of male responsibility and sensitivity towards women, as well as the ill effects of alcohol consumption and substance abuse.

Plot

Raghuraj Pratap Singh (Ravi Kishan) is a bureaucratic police officer who prosecutes rapists. He falls in love with a Muslim woman named Sahiba. Rathi and his three brothers gang-rape minors, and Raghuraj takes action against them. To take revenge, Rathi and his three brothers gang-rape Sahiba (Anjana Singh) and kill her. Raghuraj gets angry and becomes "Sanki Daroga".

Cast
Ravi Kishan as Inspector Raghuraj Pratap Singh, a tough police officer
Anjana Singh as Sahiba, a Muslim woman
Manoj Tiger as Sub Inspector Tiwari
Pappu Yadav as Rathi, a gangster

Music
The soundtrack for Sanki Daroga was composed by Shyam Dehati, Dheeraj Sen, and Pradeep Pandey, with lyrics penned by Shyam Dehati and Jamie Sayyed. The soundtrack included 11 tracks. It was produced under the Zee Music Company label.

Production
A major portion of the film was shot in Ranchi and other parts of Jharkhand. Producer Ravi Kishan said that the natural beauty of Jharkhand made it an attractive location for shooting. The character of Rathi, as portrayed by Pappu Yadav, was inspired by real-life criminal Sunil Rathi, who murdered the politician Munna Bajrangi.

Marketing
Three posters of the film were revealed in 2018 on 30 May, 23 June, and 30 June, respectively. They were revealed on the social media accounts of Ravi Kishan and Zee Music Company. The teaser trailer was released on 13 June 2018 with the tagline: "Balaatkariyon ke liye daroga nahin jallad hain hum" ( "I'm not an inspector, but a butcher for rapists"), on an official YouTube account of Zee Music Company, Zee Music Bhojpuri. The full-length trailer was then released by DGP D. K. Pandey on 17 July 2018 in Jharkhand.

References
Directed by Siaf Kidwai of saifkidwai.com

External links 

 

Directed by Siaf Kidwai of saifkidwai.com

2018 films
Films about rape in India
Indian action drama films
2010s Bhojpuri-language films
2018 action drama films